Bayshore is a neighborhood of Mid-Beach in the city of Miami Beach, Florida, United States.  It is located in the center portion of the main island that the city occupies.  Originally built around Carl Fisher's Bayshore Golf and Country Club, with a course designed by H.C. Tippet which opened in 1923, the area is roughly bound by the Collins Canal to the south, 41st Street to the north, Indian Creek to the east, and Biscayne Bay to the west. The neighborhood is characterized largely by single family homes and municipal uses (Miami Beach Golf Club, Miami Beach High School, Scott Rakow Youth Center).

References

External links
 Miami Beach Golf Club

Neighborhoods in Miami Beach, Florida
Populated places on the Intracoastal Waterway in Florida